Mercy Mwethya Joseph (born 21 March 1992) is a Kenyan badminton player. She was selected among the 14 best African players to be a member of the Road to Rio Program organised by the BWF and Badminton Confederation of Africa, to provide financial and technical support to African players and the lead-up to the 2016 Olympic Games in Rio de Janeiro. She was the women's doubles bronze medallist at the 2015 All-Africa Games, and has competed at the 2010, 2014, and 2018 Commonwealth Games.

Achievements

All-Africa Games 
Women's doubles

BWF International Challenge/Series (1 title, 2 runners-up)
Mixed doubles

 BWF International Challenge tournament
 BWF International Series tournament
 BWF Future Series tournament

References

External links
 

1992 births
Living people
Sportspeople from Nairobi
Kenyan female badminton players
Badminton players at the 2010 Commonwealth Games
Badminton players at the 2014 Commonwealth Games
Badminton players at the 2018 Commonwealth Games
Commonwealth Games competitors for Kenya
Competitors at the 2011 All-Africa Games
Competitors at the 2015 African Games
Competitors at the 2019 African Games
African Games bronze medalists for Kenya
African Games medalists in badminton
21st-century Kenyan women